Switzerland County Courthouse is a historic courthouse located at Vevay, Switzerland County, Indiana. It was built between 1862 and 1864, and is a three-story, rectangular Greek Revival style red brick building with limestone and white painted wood trim. The building measures 52 feet by 96 feet. It features a tall, pedimented tetrastyle portico with fluted Corinthian order columns.  The building is topped by a copper clad dome with cupola.

It was listed on the National Register of Historic Places in 2009.

References

County courthouses in Indiana
Courthouses on the National Register of Historic Places in Indiana
Greek Revival architecture in Indiana
Government buildings completed in 1864
Buildings and structures in Switzerland County, Indiana
National Register of Historic Places in Switzerland County, Indiana